Aghuz Koti or Aghuzkati may refer to:
 Aghuz Koti, Amol
 Aghuz Koti, Nur
 Aghuz Koti, Ramsar
 Aghuz Koti, Tonekabon